Dolgoma ovalis is a moth of the family Erebidae. It is found in Shaanxi, China.

References

Moths described in 2000
Dolgoma